Poet, Fool or Bum is a studio album by Lee Hazlewood, released in 1973.

Critical reception

John Bush of AllMusic gave the album 3 stars out of 5, saying: "Poet, Fool or Bum caught Lee Hazlewood in a sentimental, chagrined mode that didn't compare well to his earlier hard-bitten material."

The NME described the album in one word, "Bum".

Track listing

Personnel
Credits adapted from liner notes.

 Larry Muhoberac – arrangement (1, 4, 5, 6, 9)
 Ernie Freeman – arrangement (2, 3, 7, 8, 10)
 Jimmy Bowen – production
Rod Dyer, Inc. – design
 Leandro Correa – photography

References

External links
 
 

1973 albums
Lee Hazlewood albums
Albums produced by Jimmy Bowen
Capitol Records albums